In information theory, the information projection or I-projection of a probability distribution q onto a set of distributions P is

where  is the Kullback–Leibler divergence from q to p. Viewing the Kullback–Leibler divergence as a measure of distance, the I-projection  is the "closest" distribution to q of all the distributions in P.

The I-projection is useful in setting up information geometry, notably because of the following inequality, valid when P is convex:

This inequality can be interpreted as an information-geometric version of Pythagoras' triangle inequality theorem, where KL divergence is viewed as squared distance in a Euclidean space.

It is worthwhile to note that since  and continuous in p, 
if P is closed and non-empty, then there exists at least one minimizer to the optimization problem framed above. Furthermore, if P is convex, then the optimum distribution is unique.

The reverse I-projection also known as moment projection or M-projection is

Since the KL divergence is not symmetric in its arguments, the I-projection and the M-projection will exhibit different behavior. For I-projection,  will typically
This is due to  whenever  to make sure KL divergence stays finite.

 
The concept of information projection can be extended to arbitrary statistical f-divergences and other   divergences.

See also
Sanov's theorem

References

K. Murphy, "Machine Learning: a Probabilistic Perspective", The MIT Press, 2012.
F. Nielsen, "What is... an information projection?", AMS Notices, (65) 3, pp. 321–324, 2018

Information theory